Yaar? is a 2017 Singaporean Tamil-language thriller starring Vighnesh Nagarajan, Mark Saravana, Kathiravan, Shafinah Banu, Dhivyah, Meshanthe, Sharon, Janani and Rupini. It replaced Alaipayuthey and it broadcast on MediaCorp Vasantham from 3 April 2017 to 29 June 2017 for 47 episodes. It was created by R. Venga and is executively produced by Shamini Maderan.

Plot
The top three winners of a beauty pageant mysteriously go missing. This brings Shamen, a decommissioned enforcement officer back into action because he has a personal attachment to the case. So who is behind the mysterious disappearances?

Cast

 Vighnesh Nagarajan as Shamen
 Mark Saravana as Anba
 Kathiravan 
 Shafinah Banu as Seema
 Rupini Anbalangan as Pooja
 Suriavelan as Prakash
 Dhivyah Davina Raveen as Chandralekha
 Meshanthe as Yazhini
 Sharon Roosevelt as Mithra
 Janani as Tharani
 S. Nivaashiyni as Madhu
 Harnitha as Nisha
 V. Punithan
 L. Dhurga
 Annetha Ayyavoo as Tina
 Kishore as Ruben
 Khomala Lea
 Jaya Shree
 Bachant kaur
 Douglas Rabinaico
 Vinod
 Gowri
 Sathish
 Sowpakivathy
 Tamaishree
 Suthashini 
 Suganiah
 Srinivasan
 Balakrishna
 Haarivanan
 Ashvari
 Ashwin
D Surya

Production
The drama was written and directed by R. Venga, screenplay by R. Venga and MD. Amin B MD Ali, Dialogue by MD. Amin BMD Ali and producer by Shamini Maderan and Assistant producer by Matthew Petra, Sharenya Devarajan and Moniykka Pushpanathan.

Original soundtrack

Title song
It was written by lyricist Soundarajan, composed Shabir  sung by Shabir and Maria Roe Vincent. The background score was composed by Vicknesh Saravanan.

Soundtrack

Broadcast
Series was released on April 3, 2017, on Mediacorp Vasantham. It aired in Singapore and Malaysia on Mediacorp Vasantham, Its full length episodes and released its episodes on their app Toggle, a live TV feature was introduced on Toggle with English and Tamil Subtitle.

References

External links 
 Vasantham Official Website Toggle

Vasantham TV original programming
Tamil-language television shows in Singapore
Tamil-language thriller television series
Singapore Tamil dramas
2017 Tamil-language television series debuts
2017 Tamil-language television series endings